Mugging or mugger may refer to:

 Mugger, a footpad
 Mugger crocodile, a species native to India, Iran, Nepal, and Pakistan
 Muggers (film), a 2000 Australian movie directed by Dean Murphy
 Mugging, a slang term for overacting
 Mugging, a type of street robbery
 Mugging, a disparaging term for rote learning
 Mugging, a Singapore colloquial term for intensive studying
  Model Mugging, a self-defense training technique

See also
 Mug (disambiguation)
"Mugged" (Flight of the Conchords), the third episode of  the TV series Flight of the Conchords